"Dream On" is a song recorded by Canadian country music artist Joan Kennedy. It was released in 1993 as the fourth single from her fifth studio album, Higher Ground (1992). It peaked at number 9 on the RPM Country Tracks chart in December 1993.

Chart performance

Year-end charts

References

1992 songs
1993 singles
Joan Kennedy (musician) songs
MCA Records singles
Songs written by Gary Burr
Songs written by Harry Stinson (musician)